The February 2004 Moscow metro bombing occurred on 6 February 2004 when a male suicide bomber killed 41 people near Avtozavodskaya subway station on the Zamoskvoretskaya Line in Moscow. Up to 250 people were injured in the incident, some of the more common injuries being broken bones and smoke inhalation.

Attack

The blast occurred at about 08:32 MSK on 6 February 2004 inside a subway car while it was moving in the tunnel near Avtozavodskaya station, on the metro system's Zamoskvoretskaya Line. A Karachay suicide bomber Anzor Izhayev from Uchkeken village detonated an improvised explosive device in his backpack.

President of Russia Vladimir Putin blamed Chechen separatists for the Moscow metro attack. Chechen rebel leader Aslan Maskhadov denied involvement.

A previously unknown Chechen terrorist group claimed responsibility for the bombing; the claim came from a group calling itself Gazoton Murdash, and signed by Lom-Ali ("Ali the Lion"). According to the statement, the group launched the attack to mark the fourth anniversary of the killing of scores of Chechen civilians by Russian soldiers in Grozny in the Novye Aldi massacre.

Perpetrators

In May 2005, Tambiy Khubiyev and Maksim Panaryin (from the Karachay-Cherkess Republic) along with Murat Shavayev (a native of Kabardino-Balkaria) were arrested by Russian law enforcement agencies in connection with terrorist attacks in Moscow, Voronezh, and Krasnodar. All of the arrested were members of an Islamic militant group Karachay Jamaat (also known as «Muslim Society No 3»). Khubiyev confessed to organizing the bombings near Avtozavodskaya and Rizhskaya subway stations in Moscow and a series of explosions in Krasnodar in August 2003. Panaryin was a suspect in Voronezh bus stop bombings and an explosion next to Rizhskaya station. Shavayev was accused of being an accomplice to Khubiyev and Panaryin during their preparation of the terrorist attacks in Moscow. Murat Shavayev, who was an officer in the Russian Ministry of Justice, denied that he had been involved in any terrorist attacks. However, according to Tambiy Khubiyev's testimony, Murat had assisted Khubiyev and another terrorist, Idris Gloov (who was later killed by the police in a shootout in Stavropol Krai), in construction of the bomb that was used by Izhayev to blow up the subway car in February 2004. Khubiyev also linked Shavayev to the Rizhskaya station bombing in August 2004, stating that the latter had smuggled IED parts to Moscow prior to the attack. 

The trial of the three bombing suspects was held in camera in Moscow City Court in 2006–2007. On 2 February 2007, the judge sentenced all the three to life in prison. Khubiyev and Shavayev each received two life terms for the   Avtozavodskaya and Rizhskaya subway station bombings, while Panaryin was sentenced to life for only the August 2004 terrorist attack near Rizhskaya station. In addition to life terms, Shavayev was sentenced to 100, Khubiyev to 150, and Panaryin to 200 years imprisonment on other charges. The court also ordered the accused to pay more than 7 million rubles in moral damages to the victims of the attacks. Shavayev, Panaryin, and Khubiyev tried to appeal their sentences, but Supreme Court of Russia upheld the February 2007 verdict.

See also
 1977 Moscow bombings
 March 2004 Madrid train bombings, a similar but larger attack.
 August 2004 Moscow Metro bombing
 2010 Moscow Metro bombings
 2017 Saint Petersburg Metro bombing

References

External links 
Moscow metro bombing: new details emerge
Many dead in Moscow metro blast (BBC)
In Pictures: Moscow blast (BBC)

21st-century mass murder in Russia
Mass murder in 2004
Operations of the Second Chechen War
bombing 2004-02-06
Islamic terrorism in Russia
Railway accidents in 2004
Suicide bombing in the Chechen wars
Terrorist incidents in Moscow
Terrorist incidents of the Second Chechen War
Terrorist incidents on underground rapid transit systems
Terrorist incidents in Russia in 2004
Zamoskvoretskaya Line
Terrorism in Europe
Islamic terrorism in Europe
2004 in Moscow
Islamic terrorist incidents in 2004
February 2004 events in Russia